Psilocistella is a genus of fungi within the Hyaloscyphaceae family. The genus contains ten species.

References

External links
Psilocistella at Index Fungorum

Hyaloscyphaceae